Tuva Airlines was an airline based in Kyzyl, in the Russian federal republic of Tuva.

History 
The airline was established and started operations in 1932 as a division of Aeroflot. It was privatised in 1992, being owned by the state (51%) and the airline's employees (49%).

In 1994, the airline's director general Anatoly Martshekhi was found dead in his bath, in an apparent organised crime killing.

Tuva Airlines went bankrupt in 2016.

Destinations 

Tuva Airlines operated the following services as of January 2012:

 
Chamsara - Chamsara Airport
Irkutsk - Irkutsk Airport   
Krasnoyarsk - Yemelyanovo Airport 
Kyzyl - Kyzyl Airport base
Novosibirsk - Tolmachevo Airport
Todzha - Todzha Airport 
Ulan-Ude - Ulan-Ude Airport 
Yrban - Yrban Airport

Terminated Routes
 
Moscow - 
Sheremetyevo International Airport since 1995 
Domodedovo International Airport since 2000 
St. Petersburg - Pulkovo Airport since 2000

Fleet 
Antonov An-2
Yakovlev Yak-40
Sukhoi Superjet 100 (10 aircraft since 2016)

References

External links 

 

Defunct airlines of Russia
Airlines established in 1992
Airlines disestablished in 2016
Former Aeroflot divisions
Companies based in Tuva
Kyzyl